José-Manuel Bejarano (born 1 April 1956) is a Bolivian alpine skier. He competed at the 1984, 1988 and the 1992 Winter Olympics.

References

1956 births
Living people
Bolivian male alpine skiers
Olympic alpine skiers of Bolivia
Alpine skiers at the 1984 Winter Olympics
Alpine skiers at the 1988 Winter Olympics
Alpine skiers at the 1992 Winter Olympics
Sportspeople from La Paz